MÁV Class M44 is a Hungarian shunting engine built from 1954 to 1971, and used by multiple railways, including Hungarian State Railways (MÁV), Polish State Railways (PKP), Bulgarian State Railways (BDŽ), Yugoslavian Railways (JŽ), and some industrial railways in the former countries of the Eastern Block.

All versions used the Ganz-Jendrassik XVI Jv 170/240 V16 4-stroke naturally aspirated diesel engine producing 600 HP (420 kW).

History
The Hungarian railway system was in a very bad shape after the ending of the war, and modernisation became important for MÁV. Ganz has built 2 generator locomotives for the suburban electrified railways during the war. MÁV needed a heavy shunting locomotive to replace the previously used old and obsolete steam locomotives, with relatively high power and acceleration. Ganz has designed a diesel electric locomotive with the then-biggest series built engine made by them, the Ganz XVI Jv 170/240. The first 2 prototypes were built in 1954, and they got the designation M424 5001 and 5002. After the good results of the tests, mass production had started. Other railways bought from this design, with similar results. After nearly 70 years, the original prototypes are still operational, and the class is still in active service, albeit with decreasing numbers.

References
SM40/41
Translated from the Hungarian article.

See also
Polish locomotives designation

Railway locomotives introduced in 1961
Bo′Bo′ locomotives
Diesel-electric locomotives of Poland
Standard gauge locomotives of Poland